Zola Kiniambi (born June 26, 1970 in Kikwit) is a former Congolese footballer.  He is the only foreign player who played in Chinese football league for more than 10 years.

Club career
Zola Kiniambi move to China in 1997.  He joined Jia A club Yanbian Aodong and scored 6 goals in his first season in the Chinese league.

He was loaned to Jia B club Tianjin Teda and scored 13 goals in 16 games in the 1998 season.

Chongqing Lifan sighed Kiniambi in 2001.

At the beginning of season 2005, he returned to Yanbian FC.

After he retired in 2008, he became a coach and interpreter for Yanbian FC.

The Chinese Football Association honored his outstanding 10-year service with a medal.

In the 2013–14 season, Hong Kong First Division League club Tuen Mun appointed Zola as the technical director of the club.

International career
He played in the African Nations Cup 1996 as a midfielder.

Personal life
Zola Kiniambi lives in Yanbian, China and has two children, both at school.

References

External links
 
 Database of Tianjin Teda foreigner players
 

1970 births
People from Kikwit
Democratic Republic of the Congo footballers
Democratic Republic of the Congo expatriate footballers
Democratic Republic of the Congo international footballers
1996 African Cup of Nations players
Expatriate footballers in China
Expatriate footballers in Turkey
Democratic Republic of the Congo expatriate sportspeople in China
Democratic Republic of the Congo expatriate sportspeople in Turkey
Living people
AS Vita Club players
Gençlerbirliği S.K. footballers
Tianjin Jinmen Tiger F.C. players
Chongqing Liangjiang Athletic F.C. players
Yanbian Funde F.C. players
China League One players
Association football forwards
Association football midfielders